The Diocese of Gothenburg is a diocese of the Church of Sweden. Since March 2018, the bishop has been Susanne Rappmann. The diocese includes the provinces of Bohuslän, Halland, and south-west parts of Västergötland. The episcopal see of the diocese is in Gothenburg Cathedral.

List of superintendents of Gothenburg
 Sylvester Johannis Phrygius (1620-1628)
 Andreas Johannis Prytz (1629–1647)
 Ericus Brunnius (1647–1664)

List of bishops of Gothenburg
 Zacharias Klingius (1665–1671)
 Laurentius Thoreri Billichius (1671–1678)
 Daniel Larsson Wallerius (1678–1689)
 Johan Carlberg (1689–1701)
 Georg Wallin the elder (1701–1702)
 Laurentius Norrmannus (1702–1703)
 Olaus Nezelius (1703–1710)
 Johan Poppelman (1711–1725)
 Erik Benzelius the younger (1726–1731)
 Jacob Benzelius (1731–1744)
 Georg Wallin the younger (1745–1760)
 Erik Lamberg (1760–1780)
 Johan Wingård (1781–1819)
 Carl Fredrik af Wingård (1818–1839)
 Anders Bruhn (1840–1856)
 Gustaf Daniel Björck (1856–1888)
 Edvard Herman Rodhe (1888–1929)
 Carl Block (1929–1948)
 Bo Giertz (1949–1970)
 Bertil Gärtner (1970–1991)
 Lars Eckerdal (1991–2003)
 Carl Axel Aurelius (2003–2011)
 Per Eckerdal (2011–2018)
 Susanne Rappmann (2018–present)

References

External links
 

 
Gothenburg
Gothenburg
Västra Götaland County
Halland County
1620 establishments in Sweden
1620 in Christianity
Religious organizations established in 1620